was an idol star and voice actress born in Funabashi, Chiba, Japan. She attended and graduated from Funabashi Municipal High School before enrolling in the University of California, Riverside in 1989. While on a trip to Arizona in November of that same year, Shiga was killed in an accident near Flagstaff when she was thrown from the vehicle due to the car rolling as it swerved to miss an animal. She died thirty-one days before her 20th birthday.

Biography 
Shiga had a starring role as one of the children answering questions in the NHK quiz show Donna Mondai Q TV from 1984 to 1985. She performed the song Yume no Naka no Rondo, which was used as the theme song for the July 1985 OVA Magical Princess Minky Momo: La Ronde in My Dream. In 1986, Shiga played the role of Yumi Hanazono, the main character in Magical Idol Pastel Yumi. Her single, Freesia no Shōnen, was used as a theme song for the same series, and this helped her gain in popularity. After playing the role of Yumi and performing the theme song for the series, she officially made her debut as an idol singer under Warner Pioneer.

The actual debut song as a singer is the song "Dream Rondo -Rondo-" released in 1985 by Victor Music Industry (now JVC Kenwood Victor Entertainment). This song was used as the theme song for the OVA " Magical Princess Kanojo no Minkyomomo Yume no Naka no Rondo " released in July 1985 .

After that, in " Magical Idol Pastel Yumi " ( 1986 ), she voiced the main character Yumi Hanazono and was in charge of the theme song " Freesia no Shounen" . ” became the format. For this reason, "Yume no Naka no Rondo -Rondo-" is now considered a pre-debut song.

Shiga's only song to be listed on the Oricon Top 100 Weekly Rankings is Freesia, which ranked as high as #48 during the week of March 31, 1987.

During the promotion of her second single, she appeared as a guest on the radio program " Kenji and Yasuko 's Omoshiro Land" ( Nippon Cultural Broadcasting ). The staff will get mad at me." As she said, she had a calm voice for a female idol at the time.

In April 1988, when she entered university, she faced the problem of balancing her studies and activities in the entertainment industry , and retired from the entertainment industry . In August 1989, she went to study abroad at the University of California , Riverside , in order to learn languages ​​and jazz , which was her favorite music genre . However, at the 10th anniversary event of the founding of Studio Pierrot held in July of the same year , she temporarily returned and acted as a moderator. This is due to the fact that the production studio of "Pastel Yumi", which was the voice actor for the main character, was "Studio Pierrot", and the relationship was deep.

However, on November 23rd of the same year (24th Japan time), when she went on a short trip after studying abroad, an animal jumped out in front of the car she was riding in with four friends on a freeway near Flagstaff , Arizona. In order to avoid it, he suddenly turned the steering wheel while driving at high speed, causing a traffic accident in which the car overturned. The four friends who were in the car were seriously injured, but survived, but Shiga died instantly from bruises all over her body when she was thrown out of the car. She was scheduled to return to Japan for the first time after her studies on December 3rd, one month before her 20th birthday .

The body was cremated locally and the remains were returned to Japan in 1990 .

Voice roles 
 Pastel Yumi, the Magic Idol series (Yumi Hanazono)

Music

Singles 
Yume no Naka no Rondo
(EP) Victor Entertainment, KV-3068
Freesia no Shōnen / Kane no Ribon de Rock-shite
(EP) Warner Pioneer, L-1730
Aoi Namida / Hishochi no Yakusoku
(EP) Warner Pioneer, L-1736
Hikōki Kumo / Ame ni Nurete Ponytail
(EP) Warner Pioneer, L-1766
Rainy Day Hello / Time for Love
(EP) Warner Pioneer, L-1819

Albums 
mariko (Warner Pioneer)
(LP) L-12579, (Cassette) LKF-8129, released 1986-06-25
(CD) 32XL-157, released 1986-07-25
(CD) WPC6-8202, released 1996-04-25
 Natsu yori Tōku made Suki
 Canvas
 Twilight Brooch
 Girl Friend
 Wonder in My Heart
 Shiokaze Station
 Taiyō ni Naritai
 Ame ni Nurete Ponytail
 Hishochi no Yakusoku
 Hikōki Kumo

mariko+3 (Warner Pioneer)
(CD) WPC6-8202, released 1996-04-25
 Natsu yori Tōku made Suki
 Canvas
 Twilight Brooch
 Girl Friend
 Wonder in My Heart
 Shiokaze Station
 Taiyō ni Naritai
 Ame ni Nurete Ponytail
 Hishochi no Yakusoku
 Hikōki Kumo
 Freesia no Shōnen
 Kane no Ribon de Rock-shite
 Aoi Namida

Compilations 
Haha to Ko no Dōyō no Kuni
(CD) 25L2-76
All songs by Fusako Amachi except 3-4, which are by Mariko Shiga.
 Gomen Gomen no Uta
 Sasuke to Tomodachi
 Fumikiri de
 Yūhi no Uta
 Kumo no Mokumoku
 Halley Suisei
 Tabetemitai na
 Akai Pīman
 Kamisamatte Nannano
 Boku no Tōsan
 Yūyake ga Mieru kara
 Supermarket Blues

Oshiete Idol Warner Music-hen Sono Ki ni Sasete
(CD) Warner Pioneer, PCD-1368/WQCL-78
 Sentimental Mini Romance (Atsumi Kurasawa)
 Bye-bye Boy ni Shite Ageru (Naomi Hosokawa)
 Futari wa Magic (Asuka Suita)
 Koi no Magnitude (Yoshimi Yokosuka)
 Sono Ki ni Sasete (Rie Hatada)
 My Boy (Kumiko Takeda)
 Chotto Henshin (Yasuko Obara)
 Honey Moon (A-cha)
 Ōenshiteru kara ne (Miki Fujitani)
 Cinderella Liberty mo Hecchara (Youki Kudoh)
 Sukeban Deka III Theme Song Medley (Yui Asaka)
 Honmoku Rainy Blues (Kyōko Katō)
 Koibito-tachi no Nagai Yoru (Yuki Hoshino)
 Rainy Day Hello (Mariko Shiga)
 Jamaican Affair (Yuki Okazaki)
 Yūgure Bon Voyage (Mikako Hashimoto)
 Hana no yō ni (Miyuki Sugiura)

Emotion 20th Anniversary Theme Collection - OVA & Movie
(CD) Victor Entertainment, VICL-60938
Disc 1
 Dallos no Theme (Horn Spectrum, from Dallos)
 Yume no Naka no Rondo (Mariko Shiga, from Magical Princess Minky Momo: La Ronde in My Dream)
 Active Heart (Noriko Sakai, from Gunbuster)
 Try Again... (Noriko Sakai, from Gunbuster)
 The Winner (Miki Matsubara, from Mobile Suit Gundam 0083: Stardust Memory)
 Magic (Jacob Wheeler, from Mobile Suit Gundam 0083: Stardust Memory)
 Just Fallin' Love: Ikustu mo no Setsunai Yoru no Naka de (Ayako Udagawa, from Dominion)
 Kaze no Tsubasa (Hitomi Mieno, from Haou Taikei Ryuu Knight: Adeu's Legend)
 Point 1 (Yumiko Takahashi, from Haou Taikei Ryuu Knight: Adeu's Legend)
 Toketeiku Yume no Hate ni (Yayoi Gotō, from Iria: Zeiram the Animation)
 100mph no Yūki (Sakiko Tamagawa and Akiko Hiramatsu, from You're Under Arrest)
 Arittake no Jōnetsu de (Sakiko Tamagawa and Akiko Hiramatsu, from You're Under Arrest)
 After, in the Dark: Torch Song (Mai Yamane and Gabriela Robin, from Macross Plus)
 Inori no Asa (Miwako Saitō, from Shamanic Princess)
 Omoide no Mori (Miwako Saitō, from Shamanic Princess)
 Future Shock (cherry, from Birdy the Mighty)

Disc 2
 Ai, Oboete Imasu ka (long version) (Mari Iijima, from The Super Dimension Fortress Macross: Do You Remember Love?)
 Tenshi no Enogu (Mari Iijima, from The Super Dimension Fortress Macross: Do You Remember Love?)
 Akira no Theme (Geinoh Yamashirogumi, from Akira)
 Voices (Akino Arai, from Macross Plus (movie edition))
 Heart & Soul (Emilia with Basara Nekki, from Macross 7: The Galaxy Is Calling Me!)
 In Yer Memory (Takkyū Ishino, from Memories)
 Calling (Nitro, from You're Under Arrest: The Movie)
 Tōi Kono Machi de (Naomi Kaitani, from Cardcaptor Sakura)
 Ashita e no Melody (Chaka, from Cardcaptor Sakura)
 Yubiwa (single version) (Maaya Sakamoto, from The Vision of Escaflowne)
 Grace - Jinroh Main Theme - Omega (Hajime Mizoguchi, from Jin-Roh)
 Ask DNA (The Seatbelts, from Cowboy Bebop: Heaven's Door)

Soundtracks 
Magical Princess Minky Momo: Yume no Naka no Rondo Ongakuhen
(LP) Victor Entertainment, JBX-25066
(CD) Victor Entertainment, VDR-1073
Magical Princess Minky Momo: Fenarinarsa Song Festival
(CD) Victor Entertainment, VDR-1085
Dendō Twin Series Magical Princess Minky Momo TV-ban OVA-ban
(CD) Victor Entertainment, VICL-60419/20
Magical Idol Pastel Yumi Ongakuhen Vol.1
(LP) Warner Pioneer, K-10037
(CD) Warner Pioneer, 30XL-149
Magical Idol Pastel Yumi Ongakuhen Sōshūhen
(LP) Warner Pioneer, K-10038
(CD) Warner Pioneer, 30XL-164
Natsukashi no Music Clip 42 Magical Idol Pastel Yumi
(CD) Toshiba EMI, TOCT-10402

Awards 
In 2001, Shiga was posthumously awarded the "Natsukashi no Ongaku Daishō" at the 17th Annual OGUmen Awards for her song Rainy Day Hello.

References

External links 
 Fansite dedicated to Mariko Shiga
 

1969 births
1989 deaths
Japanese women pop singers
Japanese voice actresses
Japanese idols
Voice actors from Funabashi
Voice actresses from Chiba Prefecture
University of California, Riverside alumni
Japanese Christians
Road incident deaths in Arizona
Japanese television personalities
Musicians from Chiba Prefecture
20th-century Japanese actresses
20th-century Japanese women singers
20th-century Japanese singers